Somveer Kadian (born 2 April 1992) is an Indian freestyle wrestler who won a bronze medal at the 2018 Commonwealth Games in the 86 kg category.

Somveer's brother Satyawart is also a freestyle wrestler and a silver medalist at the 2014 Commonwealth Games.

References

External links
 
 

1992 births
Living people
Indian male sport wrestlers
Sport wrestlers from Haryana
People from Rohtak
Commonwealth Games medallists in wrestling
Commonwealth Games bronze medallists for India
Wrestlers at the 2018 Commonwealth Games
21st-century Indian people
Medallists at the 2018 Commonwealth Games